The Black Flower is a 1997 historical fiction novel written by Howard Bahr.  It received numerous accolades, including being named a New York Times Notable Book. Shelby Foote, author of The Civil War: A Narrative, recommends it highly. The Black Flower was nominated for a Stephen Crane Award for First Fiction, and won the W.Y. Boyd Literary Award for Excellence in Military Fiction in 1998.

The novel is about Private Bushrod Carter's experiences in the Battle of Franklin. It was published by Picador

Plot summary
The story begins with Private Bushrod Carter in the hours before the Battle of Franklin. He is joined by his friends, Jack Bishop and Virgil C. Johnson. Before the battle, he has several flashbacks to his friends and himself as children and to an earlier battle field where he helped to bury the dead with the 'Strangers' (his name for the Federal soldiers). Other characters are introduced, including Caroline McGavock who owns the house that will become the field hospital for the Confederate wounded, Anna Hereford, Caroline's cousin who is staying with her, Nebo Gloster, a new recruit who is horrible with his fire arm, and Simon Rope, a former deserter who has a hatred for Bushrod's friend Jack Bishop. The battle is not shown and the story moves onto the McGavock plantation house that is the acting field hospital. Anna and Caroline deal with the dead and wounded and an injured Bushrod who has lost a finger and suffered a severe head trauma is brought in. Anna helps to bandage Bushrod and they begin to develop a friendship as Bushrod helps Anna in the field hospital and she helps him try to find his friends on the battlefield. They are joined by the unharmed Nebo Gloster who Bushrod remembers, accidentally shot Virgil C. in the back of the head. Anna convinces Bushrod to not take revenge on Nebo and they eventually find Jack Bishop who is close to death. Before he can die though they are confronted by Simon Rope, who threatens to rape and kill Anna if Bushrod does not let him kill Jack. They are saved though by Nebo who stabs Simon in the back with a ramrod. After burying Jack and Virgil C., Bushrod suddenly has a great pain in his arm and it is discovered that his wound has become infected. The surgeons amputate his arm in an attempt to save his life, but it does not work. Anna stays with him through the night as he slips away and then goes to bury him with her family the next day.

References

1997 novels
Novels set during the American Civil War